

National Scenic Byways

References

Scenic Byways
Illinois